The 2nd Canadian Screen Awards were held on March 9, 2014, to honour achievements in Canadian film, television, and digital media production in 2013. Awards in technical and some other categories were presented in a series of advance ceremonies during the week of March 3 to 8.

Nominations were announced on January 13, 2014. In film categories, Denis Villeneuve's Enemy led with 10 nominations, while in the television categories, the science fiction series Orphan Black received 14 nominations.

The awards ceremony were hosted by Martin Short for the second time, at the Sony Centre for the Performing Arts in Toronto, Ontario, and marked the 65th anniversary of the creation of the original Canadian Film Awards.

Film

Television

Programs

Actors

News and information

Sports

Direction

Craft

Music

Writing

Digital media

Multiple nominations and awards

Special awards
Several special awards were given:
Board of Directors' Tribute: Ted Kotcheff
Board of Directors' Tribute: Marjorie Anthony Linden
Lifetime Achievement Award: David Cronenberg
Earle Grey Award: Colm Feore
Digital Media Trailblazing Award: Alan Sawyer
Margaret Collier Award: Semi Chellas
Humanitarian Award: Alanis Obomsawin
Outstanding Technical Achievement Award: iGateway of CTV News
Fan Choice Award for Favourite Canadian Screen Star: Zoie Palmer

References

External links
Canadian Screen Awards

02
2014 in Canadian cinema
2013 film awards
2013 television awards
2013 awards in Canada